The Battle of Krosno on December 7, 1655. Polish-Lithuanian Commonwealth forces under the command of Gabriel Wojniłłowicz defeated the Swedish forces, supported by their Polish allies under Colonel Aleksander Pracki. The battle was regarded as a symbol of Polish resistance to the invaders, as it was first Polish victory since the Swedish invasion of summer 1655. 

In November 1655, when Swedish forces reached Krosno, the town opened its gates to the invaders. The sejmik of the Przemysl Land, which convened here, pledged allegiance to Charles Gustav. Soon afterwards, however, residents of Krosno saw the real face of the Swedes, who looted, plundered, murdered people and burned houses. Organized by Colonel Gabriel Wojniłłowicz, they renounced their pledge and attacked Swedish garrison, together with their Polish allies. Surprised Swedes lost the battle, and the Poles recaptured the town. Traitors, together with Pracki, were hanged in the market square, while Wojniłłowicz with his unit headed towards Biecz and Nowy Sącz.

References
Andrzej Borcz; Działania wojenne na terenie ziemi przemyskiej i sanockiej w latach "potopu" 1655-1657, Przemyśl 1999 r., 
Marian Ziobro, Krosno i okolice, Rzeszów 1986 r.
Samuel Grądzki, Historia belli Cosacco-Polonici, wyd. K. Koppi, Pestini 1789,
Mieczysław Brzyski, Szwedzi w Małopolsce w latach 1655-1657, Praca dyplomowa w seminarium prof. dr Adama Przybosia, Kraków 1972

Krosno
1655 in Europe
Krosno
Krosno
Krosno
Krosno
1655 in the Polish–Lithuanian Commonwealth